Yantra tattooing or Sak Yant is a form of tattooing sometimes using Indian yantra designs. It consists of sacred geometrical, animal and deity designs accompanied by Pali phrases (or Khmer script) that are said to offer power, protection, fortune, charisma and other benefits for the bearer.

History
Tattoos believed to offer protection and other benefits have been recorded everywhere throughout both mainland Southeast Asia and as far south as Indonesia and the Philippines. Over the centuries the tradition spread to what is now Cambodia, Laos, Thailand, and parts of Myanmar. While the tradition itself originates with indigenous tribal animism, it became closely tied to the Hindu-Buddhist concept of yantra or mystical geometric patterns used during meditation. Tattoos of yantra designs were believed to hold magic power, and were used much like the kolam tattoos of India. For these people, religion is closely tied to the notion of magic, health, and good fortune.

The script used for yantra designs varies according to culture and geography. In Cambodia and central Thailand, the Old Khmer script (Cambodian language) of the Khmer Empire is used.  While in northern Thailand yantra tattoos may use Shan, northern Thai, or Tai Lu scripts, and in Laos the Lao Tham script is employed. The script spells out abbreviated syllables from Pali incantations. Different Arjans (masters) have added to these designs over the centuries through visions received in their meditations. Some yantra designs have been adapted from pre-Buddhist shamanism and the belief in animal spirits that was found in Southeast Asia and incorporated into Thai tradition and culture.

Meaning
Yantra tattoos are believed to be magic and bestow mystical powers, protection, or good luck. There are three main effects of a yantra tattoo. One is that which benefits the wearer, such as making them more eloquent. Another is that of protection and to ward off evil and hardship. This is commonly used by military personnel, police, taxi drivers, gangsters and others in perceived dangerous professions. Another type is that which affects people around the wearer, such as invoking fear. The yantra is only as powerful as the Arjun that applies it, and only confers its powers so long as the bearer observes Buddhist rules and taboos.

Sak yan designs are also applied to many other media, such as cloth or metal, and placed in one's house, place of worship, or vehicle as a means of protection from danger or illness, to increase wealth, and to attract lovers. In recent years Hollywood celebrities such as Angelina Jolie, whose tattoos were inked by Arjan Noo Ganpai with Khmer script Sak yant in Thailand, have made them popular among women.  Angelina Jolie got a yantra tattoo of a Bengal tiger in 2004 to celebrate acquiring Cambodian citizenship.   

However a modern movement in Thailand seeks to progress away from their animistic past. As part of this movement, many modern-day Thais view yantra tattoos as nothing more than good-luck symbols that are stylish.

Types and designs

There are many traditional types and designs of yantra tattoos, but some of the most well-known and popular include:
 
 Ong Phra (translation: Buddha's body) - one of the most commonly used elements in Yantra tattooing, but can also be a more complex standalone design. Meant to provide insight, guidance, illumination, etc.
 Ha-thaeo (translation: five rows) - Typically tattooed on the back left shoulder. Each of the five lines relates to a different blessing for success and good luck.
 Kao-yot (translation: nine spires) - typically tattooed on the center top of the back in various sizes and levels of complexity. Simple version pictured at the top of this article.
 Si-yot (translation: four spires) - to influence the feelings or actions of others and protect the bearer.
 Paet-thit (translation: eight points) - represents protection in the eight directions of the universe. Round shape; typically tattooed on the center of the back. Pictured in gallery below.
 Sip-thit (translation: ten points) - a version of paet-thit, but protects in ten directions instead of eight.
 Maha-niyom (translation: great preference) - to grant the bearer favor in the eyes of others. Round shape; typically placed on the back right shoulder.
 Yot Mongkut (translation: spired crown) - for good fortune and protection in battle. Round shape; typically tattooed on the top of the head.
 Panchamukhi (translation: five Deva faces) - intended to ward off illness and danger.
 Suea (translation: tiger) - typically depicts twin tigers. Represents power and authority.
 Uṇālom (translation: urna, often left untranslated as "unalome") - the ūrṇā curl the between eyebrows of the Buddha. Variously described as representing the 'third eye', the path to nirvana, and the coil, line, and point of the syllable 'Om' written in Thai script.

Locations
 One of the most famous temples in the present day for yantra tattooing is Wat Bang Phra in Nakhon Chai Si District, Nakhon Pathom Province, Thailand. Ajaan Noo Kanpai, perhaps the most famous practitioner of sak yan in Thailand, trained here.
 One well-known temple in northern Thailand is Wat Nhong Khem (khem means needle). It is in San Patong just outside Chiang Mai and was home to the late sak yan master Phra Ajaan Gamtawn, who died in Chiang Mai on 14 September 2010. This temple no longer applies tattoos.

Gallery

See also
Cetiya
Sacca-kiriyā
Jinapañjara
Luang pho phet
Thai Buddha amulet
Rangoli
Tattooing in Burma

References

Further reading
 Chean Rithy Men. "The Changing Religious Beliefs and Ritual Practices among Cambodians in Diaspora", in Journal of Refugee Studies. Vol. 15, No. 2 2002, pp 222–233.
 Cummings, Joe. Sacred Tattoos of Thailand: Exploring the Masters, Magic and Mystery of Sak Yan. Singapore, 2011.
 Drouyer, Isabel; Drouyer, Rene. Thai Magic Tattoos The Art And Influence of Sak Yant. Ed. River Books, 2013.
 Harris, Ian. Cambodian Buddhism: History and Practice. Honolulu, 2008.
 Igunma, Jana.  "Human Body, Spirit and Disease; the Science of Healing in 19th century Buddhist Manuscripts from Thailand", in The Journal of the International Association of Buddhist Universities. Vol. 1,  2008, pp. 120–132.
 Rivers, Victoria Z. "Layers of Meaning: Embellished Cloth for Body and Soul", in Jasleen Dhamija, Asian Embroidery. New Delhi, 2004, pp. 45–66. .
 Swearer, Donald K. Becoming the Buddha: the Ritual of Image Consecration in Thailand. Princeton, 2004.

Buddhist art
Buddhist mysticism
Cambodian culture
Magic (supernatural)
Tattooing traditions
Thai culture
Tantra